Mateo Iturralde is a corregimiento in San Miguelito District, Panamá Province, Panama with a population of 11,496 as of 2010. Its population as of 1990 was 13,662; its population as of 2000 was 12,607.

References

Corregimientos of Panamá Province
San Miguelito District